Kalhara (Sinhala: කල්හාර) is a Sri Lankan name that may refer to the following notable people:
Given name
Kalhara Peiris, Sri Lankan cricketer
Kalhara Senarathne (born 2000), Sri Lankan cricketer

Surname
Kasun Kalhara (born 1981), Sri Lankan singer and musician
Vihanga Kalhara (born 1993), Sri Lankan cricketer

Sinhalese masculine given names
Sinhalese surnames